This is a list of the Pakistan cricket team's performance in 2010

Team performance in 2010 in Tests

Team performance in 2010 in ODIs

Team performance in 2010 T20s

Pakistan overall performance in 2010

See also 
Pakistan cricket team performance in 2011